Ömer Besim Koşalay (10 February 1898 – 11 November 1956) was a Turkish middle-distance runner. He competed in the 800 metres at the 1924 Summer Olympics and the 1928 Summer Olympics.

References

External links
 

1898 births
1956 deaths
Athletes (track and field) at the 1924 Summer Olympics
Athletes (track and field) at the 1928 Summer Olympics
Turkish male middle-distance runners
Olympic athletes of Turkey
Sportspeople from Istanbul
20th-century Turkish people